is a passenger railway station located in the city of Mobara, Chiba Prefecture Japan, operated by the East Japan Railway Company (JR East).

Lines

Station layout
The station consists of a single island platform serving two tracks, connected to a one-story station building. The station is staffed.

Platform

History
Shin-Mobara Station was opened on 1 September 1955 as a passenger station on the Japan National Railways. Freight operations began on 1 December 1981, with the construction of a spur line to the nearby Mitsui Kagagu Ichihara factory. The station joined the JR East network upon the privatization of the Japan National Railways (JNR) on 1 April 1987, with freight operations coming under the control of the Japan Freight Railway Company. Freight container operations began from October 1994, but were discontinued in March 1996 and all freight operations ceased from 1 April 1999.

Passenger statistics
In fiscal 2019, the station was used by an average of 1,259 passengers daily (boarding passengers only).

Surrounding area
 
Mitsui Chemical - Mobara factory

See also
 List of railway stations in Japan

References

External links

  JR East Station information 

Railway stations in Japan opened in 1955
Railway stations in Chiba Prefecture
Mobara